Cat Mario may refer to:
 Syobon Action, PC game parodying Super Mario Bros.
 Form of Mario in Super Mario 3D World, Wii U game